Zhang Shuai (Chinese: 张帅) (born July 20, 1981 in Qingdao, Shandong) is a former Chinese international football player who played his whole career with Beijing Guoan as a versatile right-back or centre-back.

Career

Early career
In 1996 Zhang Shuai would leave home and move to Beijing to start his football career where he would eventually gain a place at the Beijing Guoan youth team and then eventually promotion to their senior team. After breaking into the Beijing squad he would be called up to the Chinese youth team, however his off-the field antics did not go down well with the management especially his nights out clubbing with his teammates, which saw him dropped from the team. Returning to Beijing he would go on to establish himself within the squad and by the 2003 league season he would aid the team to win the 2003 Chinese FA Cup.

After achieving success with Beijing Zhang Shuai was given a drugs test during the off season on 22 December 2003, which he failed and was given a three-month ban for testing positive for the banned substance ephedrine. He became the first Chinese player ever to be banned for using drugs in football and was personally fined an undisclosed amount. Zhang claimed his innocence by saying he accidentally took the substance for a remedy to his cold, however his apologies were not enough for the Chinese youth team and they permanently dropped him from their squad once more. Beijing Guoan stuck by him and he would surprisingly miss very little of the 2004 league season and would even go on to win the 2004 Chinese Super Cup at the end of the season.

Retirement
Zhang Shuai's career would go from strength to strength, winning his first senior international cap for China against Thailand in a friendly on May 16, 2007 in a 1–0 defeat where despite the defeat his performance was good enough for him to become a regular within the squad and go to the 2007 AFC Asian Cup. His career drastically changed when he had a terrible performance against Shanghai Shenhua in a game, which saw him make a dreadful mistake that lead to a Shanghai goal. This saw him to being forced into the reserve team and frozen out of the squad, Zhang would later announce that he decided to retire from association football because of this unfair punishment.

Honours
Beijing Guoan
Chinese FA Cup: 2003
Chinese Football Super Cup: 2003

References

External links
 
 

1981 births
Living people
Association football fullbacks
Footballers from Qingdao
Beijing Guoan F.C. players
Chinese footballers
2007 AFC Asian Cup players
China international footballers